Jetstream Express is a former British airline based at Blackpool International Airport.

Jetstream Express was operated by Jetstream Executive Travel Limited. The airline began flights in May 2007 with several flights per week from Blackpool International Airport to Belfast City airport, Southampton Airport and Aberdeen Airport, aimed at both business and leisure travellers.

Flights to Belfast started on 8 May 2007 with ten flights each week. Flights to Aberdeen started on 4 June 2007 with five flights each week. Flights to Southampton were due to start on 2 July 2007. Its fleet consisted of four BAe Jetstream 31 (J31).

In June 2007 a notice appeared on the Jetsteam Express website stating: "With immediate effect, Jetstream Express have ceased operating the routes to Blackpool, Aberdeen, Southampton and Belfast", adding that all flights were withdrawn as the routes have not proved viable.

See also
 List of defunct airlines of the United Kingdom

References

External links
Jetstream Express (no longer active)

Defunct airlines of the United Kingdom
Airlines established in 2007
Airlines disestablished in 2007
Companies based in Blackpool